The Seattle SuperSonics (commonly known as the Seattle Sonics) were an American professional basketball team based in Seattle. The SuperSonics competed in the National Basketball Association (NBA) as a member club of the league's Western Conference Pacific and Northwest divisions from 1967 until 2008. After the 2007–08 season ended, the team relocated to Oklahoma City, where they now play as Oklahoma City Thunder.

Sam Schulman owned the team from its 1967 inception until 1983. It was then owned by Barry Ackerley until 2001, when it came under ownership of Basketball Club of Seattle, headed by Starbucks chairman emeritus, former president and CEO Howard Schultz. On July 18, 2006, Basketball Club of Seattle sold  SuperSonics and its Women's National Basketball Association (WNBA) sister franchise Seattle Storm to Professional Basketball Club LLC, headed by Oklahoma City businessman Clay Bennett. The NBA Board of Governors approved the sale on October 24, 2006, and finalized it seven days later, at which point the new ownership group took control. After failing to find public funding to construct a new arena in the Seattle area, SuperSonics moved to Oklahoma City before the 2008–09 season, following a $45 million settlement with the city of Seattle to pay off their existing lease at the KeyArena at Seattle Center before it expired in 2010.

Seattle SuperSonics played their home games at KeyArena (originally the Seattle Center Coliseum) for 33 of the franchise's 41 seasons in Seattle. In 1978, the team moved to the Kingdome, which they shared with Major League Baseball (MLB)  team Seattle Mariners  and National Football League (NFL) team Seattle Seahawks. SuperSonics returned to the Coliseum in 1985, and temporarily moved to Tacoma Dome for the 1994–95 season while the Coliseum was renovated and renamed KeyArena.

Seattle SuperSonics won the NBA championship in 1979. The franchise won Western Conference titles in 1978, 1979 and 1996; and six divisional titles—their last being in 2005—five in the Pacific Division and one in the Northwest Division. The franchise attained a 1,745–1,585 regular season win–loss record, as well as a 107–110 playoff win–loss record during its time in Seattle. Both marks would rank in the top half of the NBA's all-time standings. Settlement terms of a lawsuit between the city of Seattle and Clay Bennett's ownership group stipulated SuperSonics' banners, trophies and retired jerseys remain in Seattle; the nickname, logo and color scheme are available to any subsequent NBA team that plays at KeyArena subject to NBA approval. The SuperSonics' franchise history, however, would be shared with Thunder.

Franchise history

1966–1968: Team creation

On December 20, 1966, Los Angeles businessmen Sam Schulman and Eugene V. Klein, both of whom owned the AFL side San Diego Chargers, and a group of minority partners were awarded an NBA franchise for Seattle, the first major-league sports franchise in the city. Schulman served as the active partner and head of team operations, and named the team SuperSonics as a nod to the city’s ties to the aviation industry, with Boeing's having recently been awarded a contract for an SST project.

Seattle SuperSonics began play on October 13, 1967; they were coached by Al Bianchi, and included All-Star guard Walt Hazzard and All-Rookie Team members Bob Rule and Al Tucker. The expansion team debuted in San Francisco with a 144–116 loss in their first game against Golden State Warriors. On October 21, the Seattle team's first win came against the San Diego Rockets in overtime 117–110, and SuperSonics finished the season with a 23–59 record.

1968–1974: The Lenny Wilkens era

Before the start of the next season, Hazzard was traded to the Atlanta Hawks for Lenny Wilkens, who brought a strong, all-around game to the SuperSonics, averaging 22.4 points, 8.2 assists and 6.2 rebounds per game for SuperSonics in the 1968–69 season. Rule improved on his rookie statistics with 24.0 points per game and 11.5 rebounds per game. SuperSonics won only 30 games and Bianchi was replaced by Wilkens as player/coach during the off-season.

Wilkens and Rule both represented Seattle in the 1970 NBA All-Star Game, and Wilkens led the NBA in assists during the 1969–70 season. In June 1970, the NBA owners voted 13–4 to work toward a merger with the ABA; Schulman, a member of the ABA–NBA merger committee in 1970, was eager to merge the leagues and he publicly announced if the NBA did not accept the merger agreement, he would move SuperSonics to the ABA; he also threatened to move his soon-to-be ABA team to Los Angeles to compete with Lakers. The Oscar Robertson suit delayed the merger and SuperSonics remained in Seattle. Early in the 1970–71 season, Rule tore his left Achilles' tendon and was injured for the rest of the season.

Arrival of Spencer Haywood

Wilkens was named the 1971 All-Star Game MVP. Schulman was awarded American Basketball Association Rookie of the Year and MVP Spencer Haywood following a lengthy court battle. The following season, SuperSonics had their first winning season at 47–35. On March 3, the team, which was led by player-coach Wilkens and First Team forward Haywood, held a 46–27 mark but late-season injuries to starters Haywood, Dick Snyder and Don Smith led to the team losing eight of its final nine games.

For the 1972–73 season, Wilkens was traded to Cleveland Cavaliers in an unpopular move; without his leadership, SuperSonics fell to a 26–56 record. One of the highlights of the season was Haywood's second-consecutive All-NBA First Team selection; he averaged a SuperSonics record 29.2 points per game and collected 12.9 rebounds per game.

1974–1983: Post-season success and championship season

Bill Russell was hired as the head coach in 1974, and he led the SuperSonics to the playoffs for the first time. The team, which featured Haywood, guards Fred Brown and Slick Watts, and rookie center Tommy Burleson, defeated Detroit Pistons in a three-game mini-series before losing to the eventual champion Golden State Warriors in six games. The next season, SuperSonics traded Haywood to New York Knicks, forcing the remaining players to pick up the offensive slack. Guard Fred Brown, now in his fifth season, was selected to the 1976 NBA All-Star Game, and finished fifth in the league in scoring average and free-throw percentage. Burleson's game continued to strengthen as Watts led the NBA in assists and steals, and was named to the All-NBA Defensive First Team. SuperSonics again made the playoffs but lost to Phoenix Suns in six games, in spite of strong performances from Brown (28.5 ppg) and Burleson (20.8 ppg).

Russell left SuperSonics after the 1976–77 season, and the team started the season at 5–17 under new coach Bob Hopkins. Lenny Wilkens was brought back to replace Hopkins, and the team's performance immediately improved. SuperSonics won 11 of their first 12 games under Wilkens, finished the season at 47–35, won the Western Conference title, and led  Washington Bullets three games to two before losing in seven games in the 1978 NBA Finals. Center Marvin Webster went to New York but SuperSonics' roster stayed largely intact during the off-season, and they won their first division title in 1979. In the playoffs, SuperSonics defeated Phoenix Suns in a seven-game conference final series to set up a rematch with Washington Bullets in the finals, in which Bullets lost to SuperSonics in five games to give SuperSonics their first-and-only NBA title. The championship team roster included Gus Williams and Finals MVP Dennis Johnson, second-year All-Star center Jack Sikma, forwards John Johnson and Lonnie Shelton, and key reserves Fred Brown and Paul Silas.

The 1979–80 season saw SuperSonics finish second in the Pacific Division to Los Angeles Lakers with a strong 56–26 record. That season, SuperSonics set an NBA record with a regular-season average attendance of 21,725 fans per game, a record that has since broken. Fred Brown won the NBA's first three-point shooting-percentage title, Jack Sikma played in the second of his seven career All-Star Games for SuperSonics, Gus Williams and Dennis Johnson were named to the All-NBA Second Team, and Johnson was also named to the All-NBA First Defensive Team for the second consecutive year. SuperSonics made it to the Western Conference Finals for the third consecutive season but lost to Lakers in five games.

It was the last time the backcourt of Williams and Johnson played together SuperSonics;  Johnson was traded to Phoenix Suns before the start of the 1980–81 season and Williams missed the year due to a contract dispute. As a result, SuperSonics fell to last place in the Pacific Division with a 34–48 mark, the only time they finished in last place. Williams returned for the 1981–82 season and SuperSonics scored 52–30 and 48–34 records during the next two years.

In 1981, SuperSonics created Sonics SuperChannel, the first sports subscription cable service; subscriptions were available for $120 ($1.33 a game) but the service shut down after the 1984–85 season.

1983–1989: A period of decline

In October 1983, original team owner Sam Schulman sold SuperSonics to Barry Ackerley. In 1984, Fred Brown retired after playing 13 productive seasons with SuperSonics; during this time, he had been on the same team roster as Rule and Wilkens during his rookie season, playing a key role on Seattle's first playoff teams, and being the team's important sixth man during the championship series years. In recognition of his contributions to the team, Brown's number was retired in 1986. Lenny Wilkens left the organization following the 1984–85 season and Jack Sikma, the last-remaining member of the SuperSonics' championship team aside from trainer Frank Furtado, was traded after the 1985–86 season.

Among the few SuperSonics highlights in the latter half of the 1980s were Tom Chambers' 1987 All-Star Game MVP award, SuperSonics' appearance in the 1987 Western Conference Finals, despite posting a 39–43 regular-season record during the 1986–87 season, and the performances of Chambers, Xavier McDaniel and Dale Ellis. In 1987–88, the three players each averaged over 20 points per game with Ellis at 25.8 ppg, McDaniel at 21.4, and Chambers at 20.4. In the 1988–89 season, Chambers had signed with Phoenix, Ellis improved his scoring average to 27.5 points per game and finished second in the league in three-point percentage. SuperSonics finished with a 47–35 record and qualified for the second round of the 1989 playoffs.

1989–1998: The Payton–Kemp era

The SuperSonics began setting a new foundation with the drafting of forward Shawn Kemp in 1989 and guard Gary Payton in 1990, and the trading of Dale Ellis and Xavier McDaniel to other teams during the 1990–91 season. It was George Karl's arrival as head coach in 1992, however, that marked a return to regular season and playoff competitiveness for the SuperSonics. With the continued improvement of Gary Payton and Shawn Kemp, the SuperSonics posted a 55–27 record in the 1992–93 season and took the Phoenix Suns to seven games in the Western Conference Finals.

In the 1993–94 season, the SuperSonics had the best record in the NBA at 63–19, but suffered a first round loss to the Denver Nuggets, becoming the first number one seed to lose a playoff series to an eighth seed. The Sonics moved to the Tacoma Dome for the 1994–95 season while the Coliseum underwent renovations and went on to earn a second place 57–25 record. Again, the Sonics were eliminated in the first round, this time to the Los Angeles Lakers in four games. The team returned to the rebuilt Coliseum, now the KeyArena, for the 1995–96 season.

Perhaps the strongest roster the SuperSonics ever had was the 1995–96 team, which had a franchise best 64–18 record. With a deep roster of All-NBA Second Team selections Kemp and Payton, forward Detlef Schrempf, forward Sam Perkins, guard Hersey Hawkins, and guard Nate McMillan, the team reached the 1996 NBA Finals, but lost to the Michael Jordan-led Chicago Bulls in six games. Seattle continued to be a Western Conference powerhouse during the next two seasons, winning 57 games in 1996–97 and 61 games in 1997–98 for their second and third straight Pacific Division titles. At the end of the 1997–98 season, longtime Sonic and defensive specialist McMillan retired, and disagreements with management led Karl to end his tenure as head coach. He was replaced by former Sonic Paul Westphal for the 1998–99 season.

1998–2008: A decade of struggles

The 1998–99 season saw SuperSonics struggle. Westphal was dismissed after the team started the 2000–01 season 6–9, and replaced on an interim basis by assistant coach Nate McMillan, who was appointed permanent head coach in February 2001. In the 2002–03 season, All-Star Payton was traded to Milwaukee Bucks; that season marked the end to the SuperSonics' 11-year run of seasons with a winning percentage of at least .500, then the second-longest current run in the NBA.

The 2004–05 team won the organization's sixth-division title under the leadership of Ray Allen and Rashard Lewis, winning 52 games and defeating Sacramento Kings to advance to the 2005 Western Conference Semifinals. SuperSonics lost in six games to the established trio of Tony Parker, Tim Duncan and Manu Ginóbili of San Antonio Spurs, who subsequently defeated Detroit Pistons in the 2005 NBA Finals. This was also  the last time this SuperSonics team would make the playoffs. During the 2005 off-season, head coach McMillan left SuperSonics to accept a high-paying position to coach Portland Trail Blazers. The season after his departure, the team regressed with a 35–47 record.

On May 22, 2007, SuperSonics were awarded the second pick in the 2007 NBA draft, equaling the highest draft position the team ever held, selecting Kevin Durant from the University of Texas. On June 28,  SuperSonics traded Ray Allen and the 35th pick of the second-round Glen Davis in the 2007 NBA draft to Boston Celtics for rights to the fifth pick; Jeff Green, Wally Szczerbiak and Delonte West. On July 11, SuperSonics and Orlando Magic agreed to a sign and trade for Rashard Lewis. SuperSonics received a future second-round draft pick and a $9.5 million trade exception from Magic. On July 20, SuperSonics used the trade exception and a second-round draft pick to acquire Kurt Thomas and two first-round draft picks from Phoenix Suns.

In 2008, morale was low at the beginning of SuperSonics season as talks with the city of Seattle for a new arena had broken down. SuperSonics had received a franchise player with second-overall pick in the NBA draft with Durant. With the Ray Allen trade, however, SuperSonics had little talent with which to surround their rookie forward and lost their first eight games under coach P. J. Carlesimo to achieve a 3–14 record in the first month of the season. Durant led all rookies in scoring at 20.3 ppg and won the Rookie of the Year award. SuperSonics, however, posted a franchise-worst record of 20–62. It was their final season in Seattle because Bennett got the right to move the team after settling all legal issues with the city. Seattle SuperSonics played their last home game on April 13, 2008, winning 99–95 against Dallas Mavericks. Throughout the game, the crowd chanted "Save our Sonics" and Durant waved his hands at the crowd. The last game they played was against Durant's future team, the Golden State Warriors at Oracle Arena three days later. KD scored 42 points.

Relocation to Oklahoma City

From 2001 to 2006, Starbucks chairman emeritus, former president and CEO Howard Schultz was the majority owner of the team, along with 58 partners or minor owners as part of Basketball Club of Seattle LLP. On July 18, 2006, after unsuccessful efforts to persuade Washington State government officials to provide funding to update KeyArena, Schultz and Basketball Club of Seattle LLP sold SuperSonics and their sister team the Women's National Basketball Association's Seattle Storm for $350 million to Professional Basketball Club LLC (PBC), an investment group that was headed by Oklahoma City businessman Clay Bennett. Schultz sold the franchise to Bennett's group because they thought Bennett would keep the franchise in Seattle rather than move it to Oklahoma City. Oklahoma City Mayor Mick Cornett said:
I think it's presumptuous to assume that Clay Bennett and his ownership group won't own that Seattle team for a long, long time in Seattle or somewhere else. It's presumptuous to assume they're going to move that franchise to Oklahoma City. I understand that people are going to say that seems to be a likely scenario, but that's just speculation.

After failing to persuade local governments to fund a $500-million arena complex in the Seattle suburb Renton, Bennett's group notified the NBA it intended to move the team to Oklahoma City and requested arbitration with the city of Seattle to be released from SuperSonics' lease of KeyArena.
The judge rejected the request and Seattle sued Bennett's group to enforce the lease that required the team to play at KeyArena until 2010.

On April 18, 2008, NBA owners approved a potential SuperSonics' relocation to Oklahoma City in a 28–2 vote by the league's Board of Governors; only Mark Cuban of Dallas Mavericks and Paul Allen of Portland Trail Blazers voted against the move. The approval meant SuperSonics would be allowed to move to Oklahoma City's Ford Center for the 2008–09 season after reaching a settlement with the city of Seattle.

On July 2, 2008, a settlement that allowed the team to move under certain conditions, including the ownership group's payment of $45 million to Seattle and the possibility of an additional $30 million by 2013 if a new team had not been awarded to the city, was reached. It was agreed the Oklahoma City team would not use the name "SuperSonics", and that the team's history would be shared between Oklahoma City and any future NBA team in Seattle. The relocated team began play as Oklahoma City Thunder for the 2008–09 season, becoming the third NBA franchise to relocate in the past decade, following Vancouver Grizzlies, who moved to Memphis, Tennessee, and were renamed Memphis Grizzlies for the 2001–02 season; and Charlotte Hornets, who moved to New Orleans and began play as New Orleans Hornets for the 2002–03 season.

In months prior to the settlement, Seattle publicly released email conversations that took place within Bennett's ownership group and alleged they indicated at least some members of the group wanted to move the team to Oklahoma City prior to the purchase in 2006. Before that, SuperSonics co-owner Aubrey McClendon told The Journal Record; "we didn't buy the team to keep it in Seattle; we hoped to come here", although Bennett denied knowledge of this. Seattle used these incidents to argue the owners failed to negotiate in good faith, prompting Schultz to file a lawsuit seeking to rescind the sale of the team and transfer the ownership to a court-appointed receiver. The NBA said Schultz's lawsuit was void because Schultz signed a release forbidding himself to sue Bennett's group but also said the proposal would have violated league ownership rules. Schultz dropped the case before the start of the 2008–09 season.

In 2009, a group of Seattle filmmakers known as Seattle SuperSonics Historical Preservation Society produced a critically acclaimed documentary film titled Sonicsgate – Requiem For A Team, which describes the rise and demise of the Seattle SuperSonics franchise. The film focuses on the controversial aspects of the team's departure from Seattle; it won the 2010 Webby Award for Best Sports Film.

Possible new franchise

Sacramento Kings 

In 2011, a group of investors led by hedge fund founder Chris Hansen spoke with Seattle mayor Mike McGinn about investing in an arena in hopes of securing an NBA franchise and reviving Seattle SuperSonics. McGinn offered to Hansen to obtain ownership of KeyArena for little to no money.

Rumors Hansen would begin pursuing a vulnerable franchise to move to Seattle began circulating. Most of the discussion centered on Sacramento Kings, a struggling franchise that had been unsuccessfully trying to replace the aging Power Balance Pavilion. The rumors were such that Think Big Sacramento, a community action group created by Sacramento mayor Kevin Johnson to develop solutions for Kings, wrote to Hansen asking him not to pursue the city's team.

On May 16, 2012, after coming to agreement, McGinn, Constantine, and Hansen presented the proposed Memorandum of Understanding (MOU) to the public.

King County Council voted to approve the MOU on July 30, 2012, adding amendments that provided for work with the Port of Seattle, securing the SuperSonics naming rights, offering reduced-price tickets, support for Seattle Storm WNBA franchise, and requiring an economic analysis.

Hansen and Seattle City Council announced on September 11, 2012, a tentative agreement on a revised MOU that included the county council's amendments and new provisions; a personal guarantee from Hansen to cover cost overruns of construction of the new arena and make up any backfall for annual repayment of the city bonds issued. To address concerns of Port of Seattle, Seattle Mariners, and local industry, a SoDo transportation improvement fund to be maintained at $40 million by tax revenue generated by the arena was also included. All parties agreed  transaction documents would not be signed and construction would not begin before the state-required environmental impact analysis was completed. By a vote of 7–2, Seattle City Council approved the amended MOU on September 24, 2012. The King County Council reviewed the amended MOU and voted unanimously in favor of approval on October 15, 2012.

In June 2012, it was revealed Hansen's investment partners included Microsoft CEO Steve Ballmer, and brothers Erik and Peter Nordstrom of fashion retailer Nordstrom, Inc. Peter Nordstrom had been a minority owner of  SuperSonics under Howard Schultz's ownership. Wally Walker, formerSuper Sonics executive, was also later revealed to be part of Hansen's group. On January 9, 2013, media reports regarding the imminent sale of majority ownership of Sacramento Kings to Hansen, Ballmer, the Nordstroms, and Walker for $500 million to relocate to Seattle as early as the 2013–14 NBA season emerged.

On January 20, 2013, several sources reported the Maloof family had agreed to sell Hansen and Ballmer's ownership group their 53% majority stake in the Kings franchise, pending approval of the NBA's Board of Governors. The next day, the NBA, Hansen, and the Maloofs all released statements announcing the agreement, which also included the 12% minority stake of owner Robert Hernreich, and based the sale price on a team valuation of $525 million.

David Stern, then NBA Commissioner, confirmed on February 6, 2013, that the Maloofs had filed paperwork with the league office to officially request relocation of the Kings from Sacramento to Seattle on behalf of the potential new ownership group. Johnson, with guidance from Stern and the NBA league office, began to assemble an alternative ownership group that would keep the Kings in Sacramento and aid in getting a new arena constructed. On February 26, 2013, the Sacramento City Council voted to enter into negotiations with an unnamed group of investors revealed two days later to be headed by grocery magnate and developer Ron Burkle and Mark Mastrov, founder of 24 Hour Fitness. An initial counteroffer presented to the NBA by this new group was deemed "not comparable" as to merit consideration. Burkle eventually left the group because of a conflict with other business interests, but offered to be primary developer of lands around the planned downtown location of the new arena to aid in city council passage of public funding for the project. Mastrov took a backseat to Vivek Ranadivé, founder and CEO of TIBCO and a minority owner of the Golden State Warriors, brought in to assemble a stronger group of investors.

Ahead of the annual Board of Governors meeting where they were expected to vote on approval of the sale of the Kings to Hansen and Ballmer's group, as well as the relocation request, members of the NBA owners' finance and relocation committees held a meeting in New York City on April 3, 2013, for the Seattle group and the Sacramento group to each present their proposals.

With the meeting of the Board of Governors to vote moved again to mid-May, the groups were asked to make another brief presentation to the full relocation committee on April 29, 2013. The committee voted to recommend rejection of the relocation request to the full board. When the Board of Governors finally convened in Dallas on May 15, 2013, they heard final presentations from both the Seattle and Sacramento groups. The BOG voted 22–8 against moving the Kings from Sacramento to Seattle.

Though initially resistant to the idea, after negotiations, on May 17, 2013, the Maloof family and Hernreich formally agreed to sell their ownership stake in the Kings (65% of the team, valued at US$535 million) to Ranadivé's ownership group.

Milwaukee Bucks
In September 2013, then-Deputy Commissioner Adam Silver announced Milwaukee Bucks would need to replace the aging BMO Harris Bradley Center because of its small size and lack of amenities.

On April 16, 2014, it was announced owner Herb Kohl had agreed to sell the franchise to New York hedge-fund investors Marc Lasry and Wesley Edens for a record $550 million. The deal included provisions for contributions of $100 million each from Kohl and the new ownership group towards the construction of a new downtown arena. During sale discussions, it was revealed Hansen and Ballmer had expressed interest in purchasing the team for more than $600 million but had not made a formal offer because of Kohl's insistence the team stay in Milwaukee.

Atlanta Hawks
On January 2, 2015, Atlanta Journal-Constitution reported Atlanta Spirit, then-owners of Atlanta Hawks, would sell the team. Initially, only majority owner Bruce Levenson would sell his stake but the remaining minority owners announced they would also sell their stakes. On January 6, 2015, Seattle Post-Intelligencer reported Chris Hansen and film producer Thomas Tull—a minority owner of the NFL's Pittsburgh Steelers—would enter separate bids to acquire the Hawks and move them to Seattle. The NBA stated the Hawks were to remain in Atlanta as a condition of their sale; additionally, Atlanta Spirit were unlikely to sell Hawks to a prospective owner that would relocate the team, in contrast with the group's sale of the now-defunct NHL team Atlanta Thrashers in 2011. Any attempt to move the Hawks out of Atlanta would incur a $75 million penalty from the city of Atlanta and Fulton County for breaking the Hawks' lease of Philips Arena before 2017. The Hawks were sold to a group led by Tony Ressler on June 24, 2015.

Future arena talks
On May 2, 2016, Seattle City Council voted 5–4 against vacating a section of Occidental Avenue South that connected property purchased by Hansen and was deemed critical to the siting of a future arena. The vote was seen as a significant delay to the MOU between Hansen, the city and King County that expired in November 2017. On October 25, 2016, Chris Hansen announced he will fund the arena without public funding. On November 14, 2016, former Seattle Seahawks' quarterback Russell Wilson announced he would be investing in the NBA arena effort.

Arena renovations

While talks about building a new arena were underway, so were talks with another group of investors—including Tim Leiweke, co-founder of the Oak View Group—who wanted to renovate KeyArena, SuperSonics' former home venue. On December 4, 2017, one day after the deal with Chris Hansen expired, Seattle City Council voted 7–1 to approve the renovation of KeyArena. The renovation was considered to mainly focus on fitting out Seattle Kraken for the National Hockey League (NHL), interest for the revival of SuperSonics remained a possibility with the renovated arena. Hansen and his fellow investors felt having a future arena should be considered as a back-up plan for the future of SuperSonics, they would support the renovation by Oak View Group if the plan to acquire an NBA team  was successful. Renovations of KeyArena, which was renamed Climate Pledge Arena, began in 2018 and were completed by the beginning of the 2021–22 NBA and NHL seasons.

Home arenas

 KeyArena (formerly Seattle Center Coliseum) 1967–1978, 1985–1994, 1995–2008
 Kingdome 1978–1985
 Tacoma Dome 1994–1995 (during KeyArena remodel)

Uniforms

Seattle SuperSonics' first uniforms had "Sonics" displayed in a font that was also used by Cincinnati Royals (now the Sacramento Kings). The road jerseys were green and had yellow lettering; the home uniforms were white with green lettering. In 1995, SuperSonics changed their uniforms, adding red and orange, and removing yellow, to their new jerseys that would last six seasons. It displayed the team's new logo on the front and their alternative logo on the shorts. The home uniforms had green stripes on the right side of the jersey and shorts, and the green road jersey had red stripes.

The final SuperSonics uniforms were worn from the 2001–02 season through to the 2007–08 season. The side's owner Howard Schultz commissioned the design from Seattle design agency Hornall Anderson. The home jerseys were white with green-and-gold trim, displaying "SONICS" across the chest. Road uniforms were dark green with white-and-gold accents, with "SEATTLE" across the chest. The alternative uniform was gold with green-and-white trim with "SONICS" arched across the chest. These uniforms were an homage to a similar style worn from the 1975–76 season through to the 1994–95 season.

Rivalries
The rivalry was fairly equal in accomplishments; both teams won one championship. The all-time record of this rivalry is 98–94 in favor of SuperSonics.

SuperSonics were rivals of Los Angeles Lakers due to the teams' longstanding pairing in the Pacific Division of the Western Conference. Lakers' sustained success meant regular-season games often affected NBA Playoffs seedings, with the teams matching head-to-head for numerous playoff battles.

Achievements and honors

Retired numbers

Notes:
 1 Also head coach from 2000 to 2005.
 2 Head coach during 1969–1972 and 1977–1985.

Basketball Hall of Famers

Notes:
 1 In total, Wilkens was inducted into the Hall of Fame three times – as player, as coach and as a member of the 1992 Olympic team.
 2 In total, Ewing was inducted into the Hall of Fame twice – as player and as a member of the 1992 Olympic team.
 3 Inducted posthumously.
 4 Also served as assistant coach (2003–2007).
 5 Also served as head coach (1998–2000).
 6 In total, Russell was inducted into the Hall of Fame twice – as a player and as coach.

FIBA Hall of Famers

State of Washington Sports Hall of Fame

Individual awards

NBA Defensive Player of the Year
 Gary Payton – 1996

NBA Rookie of the Year Award
 Kevin Durant – 2008

NBA Finals MVP
 Dennis Johnson – 1979

NBA Executive of the Year
 Zollie Volchok – 1983
 Bob Whitsitt – 1994

NBA Most Improved Player Award
 Dale Ellis – 1987

J. Walter Kennedy Citizenship Award
 Slick Watts – 1976

NBA Sportsmanship Award
 Hersey Hawkins – 1999
 Ray Allen – 2003

All-NBA First Team
 Spencer Haywood – 1972, 1973
 Gus Williams – 1982
 Gary Payton – 1998, 2000

All-NBA Second Team
 Spencer Haywood – 1974, 1975
 Dennis Johnson – 1980
 Gus Williams – 1980
 Shawn Kemp – 1994, 1995, 1996
 Gary Payton – 1995, 1996, 1997, 1999, 2002
 Vin Baker – 1998
 Ray Allen – 2005

All-NBA Third Team
 Dale Ellis – 1989
 Gary Payton – 1994, 2001
 Detlef Schrempf – 1995

NBA All-Defensive First Team
 Slick Watts – 1976
 Dennis Johnson – 1979, 1980
 Gary Payton – 1994–2002

NBA All-Defensive Second Team
 Lonnie Shelton – 1982
 Jack Sikma – 1982
 Danny Vranes – 1985
 Nate McMillan – 1994, 1995

NBA All-Rookie First Team
 Bob Rule – 1968
 Al Tucker – 1968
 Art Harris – 1969
 Tom Burleson – 1975
 Jack Sikma – 1978
 Xavier McDaniel – 1986
 Derrick McKey – 1988
 Jeff Green – 2008
 Kevin Durant – 2008

NBA All-Rookie Second Team
 Gary Payton – 1991
 Desmond Mason – 2001
 Vladimir Radmanović – 2002

All-Star Game

NBA All-Star Game
 Walt Hazzard – 1968
 Lenny Wilkens – 1969, 1970, 1971
 Bob Rule – 1969
 Spencer Haywood – 1972–1975
 Fred Brown – 1976
 Dennis Johnson – 1979, 1980
 Jack Sikma – 1979–1985
 Paul Westphal – 1981
 Lonnie Shelton – 1982
 Gus Williams – 1982, 1983
 David Thompson – 1983
 Tom Chambers – 1987
 Xavier McDaniel – 1988
 Dale Ellis – 1989
 Shawn Kemp – 1993–1997
 Gary Payton – 1994–1998, 2000–2003
 Detlef Schrempf – 1995, 1997
 Vin Baker – 1998
 Ray Allen – 2004–2007
 Rashard Lewis – 2005

NBA All-Star Game MVPs
 Lenny Wilkens – 1971
 Tom Chambers – 1987

NBA All-Star Game head coaches
 Lenny Wilkens – 1979, 1980
 George Karl – 1994, 1996, 1998

Staff

Head coaches

General managers

Records and leaders

Franchise leaders
Points scored (regular season) (as of the end of the 2007–08 season)

 Gary Payton (18,207)
 Fred Brown (14,018)
 Jack Sikma (12,258)
 Rashard Lewis (12,034)
 Shawn Kemp (10,148)
 Gus Williams (9,676)
 Dale Ellis (9,405)
 Xavier McDaniel (8,438)
 Spencer Haywood (8,131)
 Tom Chambers (8,028)
 Ray Allen (7,237)
 Detlef Schrempf (6,870)
 Dick Snyder (6,507)
 Derrick McKey (6,159)
 Lenny Wilkens (6,010)
 Bob Rule (5,646)
 Vin Baker (5,054)
 Sam Perkins (4,844)
 Nate McMillan (4,733)
 Dennis Johnson (4,590)
 Lonnie Shelton (4,460)
 Ricky Pierce (4,393)
 Brent Barry (4,107)
 Tom Meschery (4,050)
 Hersey Hawkins (3,798)
 Michael Cage (3,742)
 Eddie Johnson (3,714)
 John Johnson (3,608)
 Slick Watts (3,396)
 Al Wood (3,265)

Other Statistics (regular season) (as of the end of the 2007–08 season)

Single-season and career leaders

Individual leaders

See also

 List of Seattle SuperSonics seasons
 Bob Blackburn (announcer)
 Kevin Calabro
 Wheedle
 Squatch
 Seattle SuperSonics relocation to Oklahoma City
 Sonicsgate
 Sonics Arena
 List of relocated National Basketball Association teams

Notes

References

External links

 Official Site (February 2008) (Archived)

 
1967 establishments in Washington (state)
2008 disestablishments in Washington (state)
Basketball teams disestablished in 2008
Basketball teams established in 1967
Basketball teams in Seattle
Defunct brands

Relocated National Basketball Association teams